The fourth season of Prison Break, an American serial drama television series commenced airing in the United States on September 1, 2008, on Fox. It consists of 24 episodes (22 television episodes and 2 straight to DVD episodes), 16 of which aired from September to December 2008. After a hiatus, it resumed on April 17, 2009 and concluded on May 15, 2009 with a two episode finale. The fourth season was announced as the final season of Prison Break, however the series returned in a limited series format as Prison Break: Resurrection, which premiered on April 4, 2017.

Cast

Main characters
Dominic Purcell as Lincoln Burrows
Wentworth Miller as Michael Scofield
Michael Rapaport as DHS Special Agent Don Self
Amaury Nolasco as Fernando Sucre
Wade Williams as Brad Bellick
Robert Knepper as Theodore "T-Bag" Bagwell
Chris Vance as James Whistler
Danay García as Sofia Lugo
Jodi Lyn O'Keefe as Gretchen Morgan
Sarah Wayne Callies as Sara Tancredi
William Fichtner as Alexander Mahone

Recurring characters

Episodes

Production
On January 13, 2009, Fox president Kevin Reilly confirmed the series would end at the conclusion of this season. He explained, "Prison Break got to a point where a lot of the stories had been told." At the time, he said there was a possibility of adding two extra episodes, he said "We want to finish strong." These extra two episodes became Prison Break: The Final Break, although they never aired on Fox, and became available only on DVD.

Home media release

References

External links
 

Prison Break
Prison Break episodes
2008 American television seasons
2009 American television seasons